Jean Rubli (born 19 August 1910, date of death unknown) was a Swiss fencer. He competed at the 1936 and 1948 Summer Olympics.

References

1910 births
Year of death missing
Swiss male fencers
Olympic fencers of Switzerland
Fencers at the 1936 Summer Olympics
Fencers at the 1948 Summer Olympics